Więckowo  is a village in the administrative district of Gmina Janowo, within Nidzica County, Warmian-Masurian Voivodeship, in northern Poland.

The village has a population of 310.

References

Villages in Nidzica County